The Atlanta Beat was a professional soccer team that played in the Women's United Soccer Association. The team played at Bobby Dodd Stadium on the campus of the Georgia Institute of Technology in its first year of operation before moving to Herndon Stadium, on the campus of Morris Brown College in Atlanta, Georgia.

History
The team began play in 2001, and reached the playoffs in each of the WUSA's three seasons — the only team in the league to do so. They advanced to the Founders Cup in both 2001 and 2003, losing on both occasions.

The Beat's "founding players" were Briana Scurry, Cindy Parlow, and Nikki Serlenga of the USA women's national team. The Beat had the #1 pick in the inaugural WUSA draft, and selected China's Sun Wen, star of the 1999 FIFA Women's World Cup. Their first goal was scored by Japan star midfielder Homare Sawa.

The coach of the Atlanta Beat was Tom Stone.

League Suspension
The WUSA announced on September 15, 2003, that it was suspending operations. Several former Beat players went on to play for the Atlanta Silverbacks Women in the W-League, and five – Briana Scurry, Sharolta Nonen, Homare Sawa, Nancy Augustyniak, and Ifeoma Dieke—played in Women's Professional Soccer.

It was announced on October 7, 2009, that a newly formed version of the Atlanta Beat would be joining WPS. On June 17, 2009, the new Atlanta Beat announced that Shawn McGee would be the General Manager of the recently reformed team.

Players (All-Time Roster)

See also

 Women's professional sports
 List of soccer clubs in the United States
 Women's association football

References

External links
 Atlanta Beat (WUSA) (archived)

 
Defunct soccer clubs in Georgia (U.S. state)
Women's soccer clubs in the United States
B
Soccer clubs in Georgia (U.S. state)
Women's United Soccer Association teams
2001 establishments in Georgia (U.S. state)
2003 disestablishments in Georgia (U.S. state)
Association football clubs established in 2001
Association football clubs disestablished in 2003